"Working Without a Net" is a song written by Gary Nicholson, John Barlow Jarvis and Don Cook, and recorded by American country music artist Waylon Jennings.  It was released in February 1986 as the first single from the album Will the Wolf Survive.  The song reached number 7 on the Billboard Hot Country Singles & Tracks chart.

Chart performance

References

1986 singles
1986 songs
Waylon Jennings songs
Songs written by Don Cook
Songs written by Gary Nicholson
Song recordings produced by Jimmy Bowen
MCA Records singles
Songs written by John Barlow Jarvis